Marco Island Executive Airport , also known as Marco Island Airport, is a public airport located in Naples, Collier County, Florida,  northeast of the central business district of Marco Island. This airport is publicly owned by Collier County.

The Marco Island Executive Airport is conveniently located to Naples, Marco Island, Goodland and Isles of Capri.

The airport was initially designed to complement plans to create a resort area south of Naples. Immediately following completion in 1976, the airport was primarily used as a marketing tool to help sell Marco Island lots. Developers would fly prospective Marco Island homeowners and investors over from Miami. Eventually the developers turned the airport over to the state of Florida, and in the 1980s the state, in turn, leased it directly to the county. Recognizing that the airport represents a community asset, the county had the foresight to maintain the airport, and in 1993, the Collier County Airport Authority was created to develop and manage the Marco Island Executive Airport. Today, the airport represents a community asset, with travelers from all over the world making their way to this general aviation airport just north of Marco Island.

Although most U.S. airports use the same three-letter location identifier for the FAA and IATA, Marco Island Airport is assigned MKY by the FAA and MRK by the IATA (which assigned MKY to Mackay Airport in Mackay, Queensland, Australia). The airport's ICAO identifier is KMKY.

The airport served as a secondary hub for Marco Island Airways until that airline ceased operations in June 1986. Currently, the airport is home to several local flight schools, public air charters, aircraft maintenance providers and the Marco Island Squadron of the United States Civil Air Patrol.

Facilities and aircraft

Currently, the Airport is in the midst of a $15 million terminal redevelopment initiative, which aims to construct a new, two-story terminal building approximately 500 feet west of the existing terminal, which is located within an unsafe distance from Runway 17/35. The project's construction commenced in April 2018 and is expected to be completed in early 2020. 

For 12-month period ending February 28, 2019 the airport had 58,430 aircraft operations, an average of 150 per day: 50% local general aviation, 42% transient general aviation, 8% air taxi and <1% military. There are 26 aircraft based at this airport year-round: 85% single engine (22), 8% multi engine (2), 4% jet aircraft (1) and 4% helicopters (1), although this figure can triple during the busy winter seasonal months that runs from November through May.

References

External links

Airports in Florida
Transportation buildings and structures in Collier County, Florida
Airports established in 1976
1976 establishments in Florida